Vadugam is a panchayat village in Namakkal district in the Indian state of Tamil Nadu. It is 32 km from Salem, 333 km southwest of Chennai, 242 km south of Bangalore and 118 km northwest of Tiruchirapalli (Trichy).

Climate
The temperature ranges from 20 to 44 degrees Celsius throughout the year.

Demographics

Administration
M. Balan is the current Panchayat President of Vadugam as of 2021.

Tourism
The main tourist and picnic spot of the Vadugam is the Perumpaalli Falls which has water falling from the height of about 100 feet at three different stages, which is located 8 km from Rasipuram, 

Every year around April the village celebrates Mariamman festival for a fortnight. During this festival, Goddess Mariamman is decorated with jewellery and flower chariots and taken around the village at midnight. This festival is celebrated for a week.

Education

Schools 

 Government Higher Secondary School - Vadugam
 Rassie Vidya Mandir Primary and Nursery School - Vadugam

The village has also has several other colleges, such as:

 Muthayammal Institutions
 Gnanmani Institutions
 Paavai Institutions
 Thiruvalluvar Govt. Arts College
 Mahendra Institutions
 AMS Engineering college
 Dr. Hanemann Homeopathy medical college

Transport
The village is situated 10 km from Rasipuram with several buses round the clock. Buses are found frequently to Salem, Nammakal, Erode and villages around here.

Nearby railway junction is Rasipuram.

References

Cities and towns in Namakkal district